Leerom Segal (born April 19, 1979, in Tel Aviv, Israel) is a Canadian businessman.

Biography
Segal immigrated to Canada and co-founded Klick Health in 1996 with  Aaron Goldstein and Peter Cordy. Segal also currently sits on the Board of Trustees for publicly traded Dream Industrial REIT (DIR.UN-T.), an unincorporated, open-ended real estate investment trust that provides investors with direct exposure to the industrial real estate sector. He is also on the Google Health Advisory Board, is a CGI LEAD mentor and co-founded Circulation, the pioneer in on-demand non-emergency healthcare transportation and Uber’s Preferred Healthcare Partner

Named one of the most inspiring leaders in the life sciences industry since 2012, Segal regularly contributes to the life sciences industry’s leading publications and holds a position on the advisory board of the Digital Health Coalition.

In 2015, he served as Chief Curator at Klick Ideas Exchange (a precursor to the BIO International Convention)  (the first BIO International Convention was held in 1993 thus the Klick Ideas Exchange as not a precursor to the convention), bringing together the top biopharma CEOs with some of the world's leading innovators, including President Bill Clinton, Drs. Eric Topol, Ezekiel Emanuel , and Daniel Kraft, biotech luminaries Martine Rothblatt and RJ Kirk, and business management gurus Tom Peters and Gary Hamel. Earlier in that year, he was named the 2015 Leadership Award honoree by the Kingsbrook Jewish Medical Center. In October 2014, he was named EY's 2014 Ontario Media & Technology Entrepreneur of the Year, plus he won the Agency Marketer of the Year Gold Award from Medical Marketing & Media magazine (MM&M) which called him "a dynamic business leader and maverick who has driven innovation". Around the same time, The Globe and Mail referred to him as a "tech prodigy".

He is a regular attendee of TED, TEDMED, and TEDGlobal. And was named to Profit Magazine’s Hall of Fame for being the youngest-ever CEO of a PROFIT 100 company.

Segal contributed a small chapter on Managing Expectations and Performance in an Organization to Managing the Executive Team: Top CEOs on Working with Board Members, Leading Team Meetings, and Implementing a Companywide Vision (Inside the Minds) book and is a licensed Buzan Mind Mapping/Speed Reading Instructor.

He has been a keynote speaker at the Cannes Lions International Festival of Creativity, TED University at TEDGlobal in Rio de Janeiro, TEDxDanubia, Google Campus London, Google Campus Tel Aviv, SingularityU Canada, Weizmann Institute, and Exponential Medicine at Singularity University.

Klick Health
Klick Health Co-founded in 1996 by Peter Cordy, Aaron Goldstein, and Leerom Segal specializes in marketing and commercialization for the pharmaceutical, biotechnology, medical device, and insurer markets across North America. Under Segal's leadership, the company continued to achieve a 30% year-over-year growth, grown to over 400 employees with an attrition rate of less than 3%, and regularly appeared on the lists of Canada's Best 50 Managed Companies, Canada's Best Small and Medium Employers, and the Deloitte Fast Technology 500. Klick is also a Branham top 5 pure-play healthcare IT company and was named by the World Economic Forum as a Global Growth Company to watch.

Segal focuses heavily on company culture, through mechanisms like Peer Recognition Awards, the Klick-It-Forward donation program, and annual viral holiday videos. Segal and Goldstein have spent much of Klick's history developing and refining Genome, an internal system that has replaced email and drives communication, collaboration, and culture. In 2014, Genome was awarded the MIX Unlimited Human Potential Challenge M-Prize and was recognized by the Nielsen Norman Group as one of the 10 Best Intranets of 2015.

Klick Ideas Exchange 
On June 15, 2015, Klick Health produced, hosted, and curated the inaugural Klick Ideas Exchange. The event brought together visionary leaders with the nation’s top biopharma CEOs to explore how emerging technologies and data can radically change the way healthcare is delivered and how healthcare companies work. The event was highlighted by a keynote by President Bill Clinton and followed by a conversation between President Clinton and Dr. Ron Cohen, event co-chair, incoming Biotechnology Industry Organization (BIO) Chairman, and CEO of Acorda Therapeutics Inc. The by-invitation-only event was held in Philadelphia as a precursor to the BIO International Convention with an all-encompassing lineup of presenters and panelists that also included Drs. Eric Topol, Ezekiel Emanuel, and Daniel Kraft, biotech luminaries Martine Rothblatt, Craig Venter, and RJ Kirk, and business management gurus Tom Peters and Gary Hamel.

The Decoded Company
On February 20, 2014, Segal published The Decoded Company: Know Your People Better Than You Know Your Customers, a Penguin Portfolio book, along with co-authors Aaron Goldstein (Klick's Co-Founder), Jay Goldman (Klick Managing Director), and Rahaf Harfoush (Technology Strategist). The book was well received by reviewers and was named a New York Times Best Seller in March 2014. Several high-profile media published excerpts of the book, including Wired and Fast Company magazines.

In an exclusive interview, Fast Company also said Segal "takes the meaning of a 'young entrepreneur' to a new level" calling his analytical, culture-centric business practices "crazy enough to work." Segal also appeared on Bloomberg Radio  and was interviewed at The CORE Club in New York City by Bloomberg host Carol Massar. As part of the book launch, he also spoke at Rotman Business School at University of Toronto, Harvard University, Wharton, Hebrew University, Tel Aviv University, and Twitter's World Headquarters in San Francisco, Later in the year, he delivered high-profile keynotes related to the book, including one at the Cannes Lions International Festival of Creativity in June  and another at TED University at TEDGlobal in Rio de Janeiro in October.

Honors, awards, and affiliations
 2004 Profit Hall of Fame  Youngest CEO of a Profit 100 Company.
 2005 Business Development Bank of Canada's (BDC) 2005 Young Entrepreneur Award for Ontario.
 2006 Ernst and Young Young Entrepreneur of the Year.
 2008 Bold 5 Under 35 
 2009  2013 TED 
 2011 The Globe and Mail Top 40 Under 40
 2011 Advisory Board Member, Digital Health Coalition.
 2011 Annual Meeting of the New Champions at the World Economic Forum (World Economic Forum Global Growth Company)
 2012 PharmaVOICE 100  100 Most Inspiring Leaders in Healthcare
 2012 TEDGLOBAL
 2012 SuperNova Award – Technology Optimization & Innovation
 2012 Dundee REIT Board of Trustees
 2013 PharmaVOICE 100  100 Most Inspiring Leaders in Healthcare
 2014 Direct Marketing News Top 40 Under 40
 2014  Globe and Mail Innovator at Work
 2015 Kingsbrook Jewish Medical Center Leadership Award
 2015 Google Health Advisory Board member
 2016 CGI LEAD mentor
 2016 PharmaVOICE Red Jacket recipient

Philanthropy and humanitarianism
 As part of Segal's philanthropic efforts, Klick has donated more than $2 million of in-kind work to charities and non-profits.
 ArtBound Ambassador  and Member of ArtBound Me to We team, Building Sustainability expedition to Kenya 2011.
 Brazilian Carnival Ball, Digital Marketing Chair
 White Knight Advisory Board
 Partnered with Free the Children

References

1979 births
Living people
Canadian businesspeople
Canadian philanthropists
Canadian humanitarians